Kindercore Vinyl is a vinyl record pressing plant based in Athens, Georgia. It began as an independent record label, founded in 1996 by Ryan Lewis and Daniel Geller to help create a unified music scene of Athens. After the dissolution of the record label, Lewis and Geller partnered with Cash Carter and Bill Fortenberry to revive Kindercore as a vinyl pressing plant. Kindercore Vinyl is the only vinyl pressing plant in the state of Georgia.

Record label 

Kindercore Records began in the mid-1990s by musicians Lewis and Geller in response to the variety of musicians in Athens, but no unifying music culture. Early releases of the label include music by of Montreal and Kincaid (Geller's own band), singles from various Athens musicians, and bigger bands such as Japancakes.

Kindercore's scope grew from a regional to national level as their records could be heard on radio stations and their bands networked with other touring bands. In 1998, the label moved to New York and joined with Emperor Norton records, creating better finances and more national exposure for Kindercore. In 2000, Kindercore moved back to Athens.

Pressing plant 
The idea of creating a record pressing plant began in 2015. Cash Carter suggested reviving the label, to which Lewis refused. Carter then suggested a pressing plant. Lewis at first rebuffed the idea, but soon agreed upon further consideration. They then partnered with Geller and Bill Fortenberry to begin plans for the plant.

After struggling to find financial backing, the group found a local investor interested in their idea to use plant-based PVC for the records. With a $1,000,000 investment, the plant acquired three brand new pressing machines, each costing $200,000, created by Canadian company Viryl Technologies. The presses, named “Warm Tone”, are fully automated, contrasting with former manual pressing machines; Kindercore was among the first factories to use such machines. Kindercore pressed its first record on Halloween of 2017 and presently can press up to 3,000 records in one day. Their focus continues to stay on local music artists of the Athens area as well as national indie bands who are often overlooked in the music industry.

See also 
List of record labels
Music of Athens, Georgia

References

External links 
Official website
Kindercore’s Tips on Pressing Vinyl
Kindercore’s Environmental Process

American independent record labels
Record labels established in 1996
Companies based in Athens, Georgia
1996 establishments in Georgia (U.S. state)
2017 establishments in Georgia (U.S. state)
Defunct record labels of the United States